Willerby was launched in 1799 as a West Indiaman. French privateers captured her around early 1802, but then released her. She suffered damage in a gale in 1815, but continued to trade. She sailed to New South Wales and was wrecked in early 1818.

Career
Willerby first appeared in Lloyd's Register (LR) in 1799.

Captain Thomas? Stimpson Levild acquired a letter of marque on 7 October 1799.

In February 1802, Lloyd's List reported that two French  had captured Willerby, Lovett, master, in the West Indies as Willerby was on her way to Jamaica from London and Madeira. Her captors took Willerby into Cayenne, but then released her. She subsequently arrived at st Vincent.

Between 1802 and 1806, Willerby left LR, but she continued to appear in the Register of Shipping (RS).

On 10 August 1815 a gale struck the convoy from Jamaica for London. After the gale Willerby, Muller, master, proceeded for Halifax. she had lost her mizzen mast and main top mast. She was also leaky. Willerby had had her ground tier of sugar washed out as she had seven feet of water in her hold before she was pumped out.

Willerby, Crossett, master, arrived in Sydney on 30 September 1816 with a cargo of merchandise. She left on 10 November, bound for Calcutta.

Fate
Willerby, Crosset, master, was carrying a cargo of rice when she was driven ashore and wrecked on Ambon Island, Netherlands East Indies in late February or early March 1818. Her crew were rescued.

Citations and references
Citations

References
 

1799 ships
Age of Sail merchant ships of England
Captured ships
Maritime incidents in 1815
Maritime incidents in 1818